Bernhoff Otelius Hansen (August 17, 1877 – December 22, 1950) was a Norwegian wrestler who competed in the 1904 Summer Olympics for the United States.

He was born in Rognan in the municipality of Saltdal in Norway. Originally he was a Norwegian wrestler in Nordland, but one and a half years before the 1904 Olympic Games, he left Norway for the United States. He was affiliated with the Brooklyn-based Norwegian Turnverein gymnastic society. Hansen was sponsored by the Norwegian Turnverein at the Olympics in 1904. Hansen won three matches at the 1904 Olympics and the gold medal in heavyweight category.

His first name was spelled "Bernhoff" by FILA and in an article by The New York Times from January 16, 1918. By the time of the article he was referred to as a "Norwegian light-heavyweight wrestler". Hansen died in New York City at the age of 73.

In 2012 Norwegian historians found documentation showing that Hansen was registered as an "alien" (foreigner) as late as 1925, and questioning whether he ever received American citizenship. The historians thus petitioned to have Hansen's gold registered as Norwegian.

References

External links

1877 births
1950 deaths
People from Saltdal
Norwegian emigrants to the United States
Wrestlers at the 1904 Summer Olympics
American male sport wrestlers
Olympic gold medalists for the United States in wrestling
Medalists at the 1904 Summer Olympics